Kenneth Lantz (born 1949) is a Swedish Christian democratic politician, member of the Riksdag 1991-1994 and again 1998–2006.

Kenneth Lantz first studied the Swedish law and later worked for an insurance company in Sweden.

References

1949 births
Living people
Members of the Riksdag 1991–1994
Members of the Riksdag 1998–2002
Members of the Riksdag 2002–2006
Members of the Riksdag from the Christian Democrats (Sweden)